The 1995–96 French Rugby Union Championship was played by 20 teams in the first division ("A1")

In the "A1" group were abstent historical clubs like Béziers, Biarritz,  Tarbes, and FC Lourdes.

The teams were divided in two pool of 10, and the first 4 were directly qualified to the "Last 16" round, while the ranked from 5th to 8th were admitted to a "barrage" with eight teams from "A2" group.

Stade Toulousain won their 13th title winning the final against CA Brive, who lost their 4th final.

Four team were relegated to lower level: Bayonne, Racing club de France, Montpellier, RC Nice et FCS Rumilly that were replaced by Béziers, Biarritz, Périgueux, Dijon, and Paris Université Club.

Stade Toulousain won his 14th title beating in the final the Bourgoin, at his first final.

Preliminary round

Barrage

Last 16

Last 8

Semifinals

Final

French Rugby Chanmpionship
French rugby union championship
Championship